The Yilan River is a tributary of the Lanyang River in Yilan County, northeast Taiwan. It flows through Yilan for 25 kilometers.

Fauna
Three turtle species occur in the Yilan River: the native Chinese stripe-necked turtle and yellow pond turtle, and the introduced red-eared slider, which outnumbers the native species. Glass eels of two eel species, Anguilla japonica and Anguilla marmorata, are found in the river.

See also
List of rivers in Taiwan

References

Rivers of Taiwan
Landforms of Yilan County, Taiwan